The Men's synchronized 3 metre springboard competition at the 2022 World Aquatics Championships was held on 26 June 2022.

Results
The preliminary round was started at 09:00. The final was held at 16:00.

Green denotes finalists

References

Men's synchronized 3 metre springboard